Vitaliy Andriyovych Masol (14 November 1928 – 21 September 2018) was a Soviet-Ukrainian politician who served as leader of Ukraine on two occasions. He held various posts in the Ukrainian Soviet Socialist Republic, most notably the Head of the Council of Ministers, which is the equivalent of today's Prime Minister, from 1987 until late 1990, when he was forced to resign. He was later Prime Minister of Ukraine, confirmed in that post on 16 June 1994. He resigned from that post on 1 March 1995.

Early life and career
Vitaliy Andriyovych Masol was born in a village near Chernihiv, Ukrainian Soviet Socialist Republic on 14 November 1928. He graduated in 1951 from Kyiv Polytechnic Institute with a degree in mechanical engineering. He worked as an engineer at the New Kramatorsk Machinebuilding Factory and rose to become the head of the technical department, the head of the mechanical shop and then the deputy chief engineer. In 1971, he was awarded a doctorate in technical science; his thesis was in regards to the fatigue strength of carbon steel used to manufacture ship propellers at the plant.

Political career

In the Soviet Union
Masol was a member of the Communist Party of Ukraine. In 1972, he became deputy chairman of the state planning committee in Ukraine at the invitation of First Secretary of the Communist Party of Ukraine, Vladimir Shcherbitsky. Shcherbitsky had intended to make him deputy minister for oil but decided that there was a more urgent vacancy on the committee. Masol later became chair of the committee and a member of the commission in charge of decontamination following the Chernobyl disaster. Masol became Deputy Head of the Ukrainian Council of Ministers on 16 January 1979.

He served as Head of the Council of Ministers (equivalent of today's Prime Minister) of the Ukrainian SSR from 1987 until 17 October 1990, when he was forced to resign and was replaced by Vitold Fokin. He was forced into resignation by Ukrainian student protests and hunger strikes known as the Revolution on Granite. Masol was a member of the Congress of People's Deputies of the Soviet Union between 1989 and 1991.

In independent Ukraine
President Leonid Kravchuk's appointment of Masol as Prime Minister of Ukraine on 16 June 1994 with his image of "an advocate of state-controlled economy" was seen as a surprise and a pre-election concession to the communist-dominated Verkhovna Rada (Ukraine's parliament). Masol was once again reinstated by President Leonid Kuchma. Masol was against most of Kuchma's reform plans and openly so; he sometimes mobilized the Verkhovna Rada against Kuchma. Masol resigned on 1 March 1995, but continued to attend meetings of the Verkhovna Rada. Masol's two periods in this office saw the beginnings of the collapse of the Soviet Union and the establishment of a new political system in Ukraine.

Awards
During his public service, Vitaliy Masol received numerous civil and state awards and recognition, including the Order of Lenin (in both 1966 and 1986), the Order of the October Revolution (in 1971), the Order of the Red Banner of Labour (in 1978), the Order of the Badge of Honour (in 1960), the Order of Merit 3rd class (in 1997) and 1st Class (in 2008), the Order of Prince Yaroslav the Wise 5th Class (in 1998) and 4th Class (in 2003).

Death
Masol died on September 21, 2018 in Kyiv, at the age of 89. The cause of death was not revealed.

References

1928 births
2018 deaths
People from Chernihiv Oblast
Prime Ministers of Ukraine
Burials at Baikove Cemetery
Chairpersons of the Council of Ministers of Ukraine
Communist Party of Ukraine (Soviet Union) politicians
Politburo of the Central Committee of the Communist Party of Ukraine (Soviet Union) members
Directors of the State Planning Committee of the Ukrainian Soviet Socialist Republic
Recipients of the Order of Lenin
Recipients of the Order of Prince Yaroslav the Wise
Chevaliers of the Order of Merit (Ukraine)
First convocation members of the Verkhovna Rada
Second convocation members of the Verkhovna Rada
Ninth convocation members of the Verkhovna Rada of the Ukrainian Soviet Socialist Republic
Tenth convocation members of the Verkhovna Rada of the Ukrainian Soviet Socialist Republic
Eleventh convocation members of the Verkhovna Rada of the Ukrainian Soviet Socialist Republic
People of the Revolution on Granite